Celtic Tales: Balor of the Evil Eye is a video game developed by Stieg Hedlund and published by Koei for DOS.

Gameplay
Celtic Tales: Balor of the Evil Eye is a strategy game in which the player is a Celtic chieftain.

Reception

Next Generation reviewed the PC version of the game, rating it four stars out of five, and stated that "As well made as it is [...] Balor is not for everyone. The game's intense complexity of play will make it unaccessible for all but the most devoted and persistent of strategy gurus. If you're the kind of player who likes to rip into a game without the instruction manual, this game will leave you completely cold." Computer Game Review was strongly positive, awarding the game a "Golden Triad" score. The magazine's Tasos Kaiafas wrote, "For a game that involves many hours to reach the end, Celtic Tales should hold your interest all the way to the finish."

Reviews
PC Gamer Vol. 2 No. 9 (1995 September)
Computer Gaming World (Sep, 1995)
PC Player - Aug, 1995

References

External links
 

1995 video games
DOS games
DOS-only games
Koei games
Turn-based strategy video games
Video games developed in the United States